Prunus discolor is a species of flowering plant in the family Rosaceae, native to the eastern Aegean Islands, Turkey, and Syria. A shrub, it is found in Quercus-dominated scrublands and rocky hillsides, typically on limestone soils. It is easily distinguished from all other Prunus species by its leaves, which are densely silvery-white tomentose on their abaxial (under) sides, and dark green and glabrous on the adaxial (upper) sides.

References

discolor
Flora of the East Aegean Islands
Flora of Turkey
Flora of Syria
Plants described in 1905